Urophora trivirgulata is a species of tephritid or fruit flies in the genus Urophora of the family Tephritidae.

Distribution
Bahamas

References

Urophora
Insects described in 1960
Diptera of North America